Trifaoui is a town and commune in Hassi Khelifa District, El Oued Province, Algeria. According to the 2008 census it has a population of 8,257, up from 6,361 in 1998, and an annual growth rate of 2.7%.

Climate

Trifaoui has a hot desert climate (Köppen climate classification BWh), with very hot summers and mild winters. Rainfall is light and sporadic, and summers are particularly dry.

Transportation

Trifaoui does not lie on any of Algeria's major highways. Local roads lead southwest to the provincial capital El Oued, north to Hassi Khelifa, Debila and Hassani Abdelkrim, and southeast to Nakhla.

Education

4.1% of the population has a tertiary education, and another 13.0% has completed secondary education. The overall literacy rate is 76.5%, and is 84.7% among males and 68.4% among females.

Localities
The commune of Trifaoui is composed of seven localities:

Trifaoui
Lizerg
Khobna
Mih Djaber
Séhine
Bellala
Lekhbaï

References

Neighbouring towns and cities

Communes of El Oued Province